Act of Succession may refer to:

Swedish Act of Succession
Succession to the Crown Act (disambiguation), several English bills
Danish Act of Succession
Bolesław III of Poland' Act of Succession (1138)